Bjorn Kristensen (also spelt Bjørn Kristensen; born 5 April 1993) is a Maltese international footballer who plays for Hibernians as a midfielder.

Early and personal life
Born in Marsaxlokk, Kristensen has a Danish father and Maltese mother. His parents met in Malta and started a family there.

Club career
He played youth football in Denmark with Hessel Gods Football School and Silkeborg IF. Upon his return to Malta, he began playing with Hibernians during the 2010–11 season. In February 2012, he went on trial with English club Everton, and also trialled with German club Werder Bremen.

International career
He made his senior international debut for Malta on 29 February 2012. He had previously played for the Malta under-21 team.

References

1993 births
Living people
Maltese people of Danish descent
Maltese footballers
Malta international footballers
Maltese expatriate footballers
Maltese expatriate sportspeople in Denmark
Expatriate men's footballers in Denmark
Silkeborg IF players
Hibernians F.C. players
Maltese Premier League players
Malta under-21 international footballers
Association football midfielders